Al Día is a general information Spanish language news medium that serves the Dallas/Fort Worth Metroplex. Al Día publishes daily on aldiadallas.com, and once-a-week (Wednesday) print edition.
It is published by DallasNews Corporation (formerly A. H. Belo) and is a sister publication of The Dallas Morning News. It has its headquarters in Downtown Dallas.

Awards 
Al Día has received several awards from the NAHP, NAHJ and Texas-APME.

Online 
Al Día publishes news stories on Facebook, Twitter and Instagram. It also publishes newsletters every week. Al Día also publishes an ePaper edition every Wednesday.

See also

 El Día
 El Nuevo Herald
 La Opinión
 La Voz de Houston

References

External links 
 

Newspapers published in the Dallas–Fort Worth metroplex
Publications established in 2003
Spanish-language newspapers published in Texas
2003 establishments in Texas
Daily newspapers published in Texas